M Akbar Ali is a Bangladesh Nationalist Party politician and the former Member of Parliament of Sirajganj-4.

Birth and early life 
M Akbar Ali was born in Sirajganj District.

Career 
M Akbar Ali was elected to parliament from Sirajganj-4 as a Bangladesh Nationalist Party candidate in 1991 and 2001. He was defeated by taking part in the nine parliamentary election.

See also 
 Jatiya Sangsad

References

External links 
 List of 5th Parliament Members -Jatiya Sangsad (In Bangla)
 List of 8th Parliament Members -Jatiya Sangsad (In Bangla)

People from Sirajganj District
Bangladesh Nationalist Party politicians
5th Jatiya Sangsad members
8th Jatiya Sangsad members